Zhenlong station, is an interchange station of Line 14 and Line 21 on the Guangzhou Metro.  It started operations on 28 December 2017 (for Line 14)  and 28 December 2018 (for Line 21), serves as the southeastern terminus of the Knowledge City branch of Line 14 and the east part of Line 21.

Station layout

Exits

Gallery

References

Railway stations in China opened in 2017
Guangzhou Metro stations in Huangpu District